Moxo may refer to:

 Moxo people, an ethnic group of Bolivia
 Moxo languages, the languages spoken by them

See also 
 Moxos (disambiguation)
 Moho (disambiguation)
 Mojo (disambiguation)
 Mocho (disambiguation)